is a Japanese professional baseball outfielder for the Yomiuri Giants in Japan's Nippon Professional Baseball.

External links

NPB.com

1984 births
Living people
Aoyama Gakuin University alumni
Baseball people from Chiba Prefecture
Honolulu Sharks players
Japanese baseball coaches
Japanese baseball players
Japanese expatriate baseball players in the United States
Nippon Professional Baseball coaches
Nippon Professional Baseball outfielders
Tohoku Rakuten Golden Eagles players
Yomiuri Giants players